Christina Vantzou is a Kansas City, Missouri-born composer and filmmaker of Greek descent based in Brussels, Belgium. First becoming known as one-half of the audio-visual duo The Dead Texan, she has released five albums of orchestral ambient music for Kranky. The albums have been accompanied by short films often making use of slow motion photography, arranged using "dream logic".

In a review of her album No. 3, online music magazine The Attic said that there was a tension that could be felt on every track but it was diverse and very rich in structure. It also said it was a sincere, sensible and reflective album.

Discography 
The Dead Texan
 The Dead Texan (Kranky, 2004)

Solo
 No. 1 (Kranky, 2011)
 No. 2 (Kranky, 2014)
 No. 3 (Kranky, 2015)
 No. 4 (Kranky, 2018)
 Multi Natural (Edicoes CN, 2020)
 Releasing Spores (Slow Moves, 2021)
 No. 5 (Kranky, 2022)

CV & JAB (Christina Vantzou and John Also Bennett)

 Zin Taylor - Thoughts Of A Dot As It Travels A Surface (Shelter Press, 2018)
 Landscape Architecture (Editions Basilic, 2020)

Other Collaborations
 Christina Vantzou, Michael Harrison and John Also Bennett - S/T (Seance Centre, 2022)

References

External links
 

American filmmakers
American composers

Kranky albums
Living people
Year of birth missing (living people)